Veronica Redd (born August 8, 1948) is an American actress who played the character of Mamie Johnson on The Young and the Restless. She is the second actress to play the role, having taken over from Marguerite Ray. Redd played the role from 1990 to 1995, and again from 1999 to 2004. In her first Hollywood acting role and TV series appearance, Redd appeared on the CBS-TV sitcom The Jeffersons playing Edith "Edie" Stokes (George Jefferson's old Navy buddy former best friend) who has transitioned to George's disbelief initially but slowly accepted her in the Season 4 episode titled "Once a Friend".

Selected filmography

Blue Hill Avenue - Nana (2001)
The Five Heartbeats - Mrs. Matthews (1991)
Clean and Sober - Head Nurse (Detox) (1988)
Picket Fences - Dairy Queen - Dr. Rizzo (Billed as Veronica Redd Forrest) (1993)
The Young and the Restless - Mamie Johnson #2 (1990–1995, 1999–2004)
Johnnie Mae Gibson: FBI - Momma Melden (1986)
The Blue and the Gray (miniseries) - Hattie (1982)
WKRP in Cincinnati (TV series) -Cora Isley (1981)
Diff'rent Strokes - The Magician - Ms. Buxton (1981)
Good Times - Willona's New Job - Mavis (1978)
The Jeffersons (TV series) - Edie Stokes (1977)

References

External links

1948 births
African-American actresses
American soap opera actresses
American television actresses
Living people
Actresses from Washington, D.C.
21st-century African-American people
21st-century African-American women
20th-century African-American people
20th-century African-American women